Pretty Little Liars is a television series which premiered on ABC Family on June 8, 2010. Developed by I. Marlene King, the series is based on the Pretty Little Liars book series by Sara Shepard. The series follows the lives of four high school girls, Aria Montgomery, Hanna Marin, Emily Fields, and Spencer Hastings, whose clique falls apart after the disappearance of their leader, Alison DiLaurentis. One year later, the estranged friends are reunited as they begin receiving messages from a mysterious figure named "A" who threatens to expose their deepest secrets, including ones they thought only Alison knew.

After an initial order of 10 episodes, ABC Family ordered an additional 12 episodes for season one on June 28, 2010. The first season's "summer finale" aired on August 10, 2010, with the remaining 12 episodes began airing on January 3, 2011. On January 11, 2011, ABC Family picked up Pretty Little Liars for a second season of 24 episodes. It began airing on Tuesday, June 14, 2011. It was announced in June that a special Halloween-themed episode would air as part of ABC Family's 13 Nights of Halloween line-up. This increased the episode count from 24 to 25. On November 29, 2011, ABC Family renewed the series for a third season, consisting of 24 episodes. On October 4, 2012, ABC Family renewed the series for a fourth season, consisting of 24 episodes. On March 26, 2013, ABC Family renewed the series for a fifth season. On January 7, 2014, showrunner I. Marlene King wrote on Twitter that season 5 will have 25 episodes, including a holiday-themed episode. On June 10, 2014, it was announced that the show was renewed for an additional 2 seasons. It was announced by I. Marlene King that the sixth and the seventh season will consist of 20 episodes each. It was announced on August 29, 2016, that the show would be ending after the seventh season, and that the second half of the season would begin airing April 18, 2017.

Series overview

Episodes

Season 1 (2010–11)

Season 2 (2011–12)

Season 3 (2012–13)

Season 4 (2013–14)

Season 5 (2014–15)

Season 6 (2015–16)

Season 7 (2016–17)

Specials

Webisodes

Pretty Dirty Secrets

Ratings

References

External links 
 List of Pretty Little Liars episodes at TheFutoncritic.com
 Pretty Little Liars Weekly Recaps

Lists of American mystery television series episodes
Lists of American teen drama television series episodes
Pretty Little Liars (franchise)